In algebraic geometry, the secant variety , or the variety of chords, of a projective variety  is the Zariski closure of the union of all secant lines (chords) to V in :

It is also the image under the projection  of the closure Z of the incidence variety
.
Note that Z has dimension  and so  has dimension at most .

The above secant variety is the first secant variety. Unless , it is always singular along , but may have other singular points.

A useful tool for computing the dimension of a secant variety is Terracini's lemma.

Examples 
A secant variety can be used to show the fact that a smooth projective curve can be embedded into the projective 3-space  as follows. Let  be a smooth curve. Since the dimension of the secant variety S to C has dimension at most 3, if , then there is a point p on  that is not on S and so we have the projection  from p to a hyperplane H, which gives the embedding . Now repeat.

If  is a surface that does not lie in a hyperplane and if , then S is a Veronese surface.

References 

 
 Joe Harris, Algebraic Geometry, A First Course, (1992) Springer-Verlag, New York. 

Algebraic geometry